The 1976 Dwars door België was the 31st edition of the Dwars door Vlaanderen cycle race and was held on 21 March 1976. The race started and finished in Waregem. The race was won by Willy Planckaert.

General classification

References

1976
1976 in road cycling
1976 in Belgian sport